Theodor Birt (22 March 1852 in Wandsbek – 28 January 1933 in Marburg) was a German classicist and novelist. He also used the name of the Humanist Beatus Rhenanus as a pseudonym.

Life 
Birt's ancestors came from Pennsylvania and had been settled in Germany for three generations. Birt's father intended for him to become a shopkeeper but allowed his musically talented son to attend the Gelehrtenschule des Johanneums, a gymnasium in Hamburg, for three years where Johannes Classen and Adolf Kiessling were his teachers. From 1872, Birt studied classics, at first for a year in Leipzig, and then (1873–76) in Bonn under Hermann Usener and Franz Bücheler. From the time he completed his studies (from his 'Habilitation,' 1878) he remained at the University of Marburg.  He became a full professor ('Ordinarius') in 1886, and taught until 1921. In 1902–1903 he was the rector of the university.

Apart from his scholarly research, he became well-known to a wider public after 1913 for a large number of works that aimed to popularize scholarship on ancient Greece and Rome. He later published fiction and literary works (short stories, historical novels, plays, and poems). His collection of biographical sketches of famous Romans remains in print today.

He belonged to academic societies: the classical studies section of the Philologisch-Historischen Vereins and later to the scholarly Verbindung Hercynia.

History of the ancient book
Birt was a pioneering and influential historian of the ancient book in Greece and Rome. His 1882 The Nature of the Ancient Book and his 1901 The Book Scroll in Ancient Art are representative of nineteenth century German classical scholarship at its best and are still widely cited. For example, in their 1987 book The Birth of the Codex, Roberts and Skeat criticized some of Birt's interpretations but added:  
'Any worker in this field must begin by expressing his obligations to Theodor Birt's The Nature of the Ancient Book ... As a collection of the literary material Birt's work is indispensable and calls for few supplements ...'
The early reception of Birt's work is reflected in a review of his work on ancient depictions of reading and book scrolls by C. B. Gulick (Harvard University):  
Just twenty-five years have elapsed between the appearance of
Theodor Birt's The Nature of the Ancient Book and the present work. Although,
perhaps, it is less important in scope and subject-matter than the earlier
book, this elaborate study of the scroll as it appears in art is a useful
contribution, exhibiting the same qualities of untiring search for all possible
material bearing on the theme, fresh judgments on that material,
careful exposition of fact, often enlivened by a pertinent comparison with
modern practice, and a genius for classification which in combined comprehensiveness
and attention to detail is admirable, even for a German.
Birt summarized his many publications on Greek philology and on the ancient book in his 1913 book Kritik and Hermeneutic.
</blockquote>

Publications

Scholarly works

1882: Das antike Buchwesen in seinem Verhältnis zur Literatur. Hertz, Berlin. - Nachdruck Scientia, Aalen 1959 und 1974
1892: Claudianus, Claudius: Carmina Recensuit Theodorus Birt. Weidmann, Berlin (Monumenta Germaniae historica, Auctores antiquissimi 10). - Nachdruck Weidmann, Berlin 1981 und MGH München 1981
1907 Die Buchrolle in der Kunst. Teubner, Leipzig 1907. - Nachdruck Olms, Hildesheim 1976
1913: Kritik und Hermeneutik. Nebst Abriss des antiken Buchwesens. Beck, München. 3. Aufl. (Handbuch der klassischen Altertumswissenschaft I, 3)

Popular literature

1894: Eine römische Litteraturgeschichte in 5 Stunden gesprochen. Elwert, Marburg. - 2. Aufl. ( in 5 Vorträgen) 1909
1909: Zur Kulturgeschichte Roms : gesammelte Skizzen. Quelle & Meyer, Leipzig. - 5. Aufl. 1935
1913: Römische Charakterköpfe, Ein Weltbild in Biographien. Quelle & Meyer, Leipzig. - 9. Aufl. 1932. 36.-40. Tsd. 1954
1916: Schiller, der Politiker, im Licht unserer großen Gegenwart. Cotta, Stuttgart. - 2.-5. Tsd. 1916
1917: Die Germanen. Eine Erklärung der Überlieferung über Bedeutung und Herkunft des Völkernamens. Beck, München
1918: Aus dem Leben der Antike. Quelle & Meyer, Leipzig. - 4. Aufl. 1925
1918: Sokrates, der Athener. Quelle & Meyer, Leipzig
1919: Charakterbilder Spätroms und die Entstehung des modernen Europa. Quelle & Meyer, Leipzig. - 5. Aufl. 1930
1919: Von Homer bis Sokrates. Ein Buch über die alten Griechen. Quelle & Meyer, Leipzig.- 4. Aufl. 1928
1922: Die Cynthia des Properz. Quelle & Meyer, Leipzig.
1924: Alexander der Große und das Weltgriechentum bis zum Erscheinen Jesu. Quelle & Meyer, Leipzig. 1924
1925: Horaz' Lieder : Studien zur Kritik und Auslegung. Quelle & Meyer, Leipzig, 2 Bände
1928: Das Kulturleben der Griechen und Römer in seiner Entwicklung. Quelle & Meyer, Leipzig
1931: Die Schaubauten der Griechen und die attische Tragödie. Gesellschaft für Theatergeschichte, Berlin
1932: Frauen der Antike. Quelle & Meyer, Leipzig
1941: Das römische Weltreich [Römische Charakterköpfe u. Charakterbilder Spätroms] Knaur, Berlin

Autobiographical

1910: Aus der Provence. Reiseskizzen. Deutsche Bücherei [Reihe], Leipzig. Nachdr. Rüsch, Großenwörden 1927
1922: Griechische Erinnerungen. Ein Reisebuch. Elwert, Marburg
1927: Marburger Licht- und Schattenbilder. Erinnerungen. Elwert, Marburg
1929: Wie ich lernte. Hamburger Erinnerungen und Stimmungsbilder aus den Jahren 1813 bis 1872. Quelle & Meyer, Leipzig

Fiction and literary works

1886: Attarachus und Valeria. Eine lyrische Erzählung von Beatus Rhenanus. Grunow, Leipzig
1895: König Agis. Eine Tragödie des Beatus Rhenanus in 5 Akten. Elwert, Marburg
1908: Artiges und Unartiges. Gedichte des Beatus Rhenanus. Elwert, Marburg. - 2. Aufl. 1924
1916: Novellen und Legenden aus verklungenen Zeiten. Quelle & Meyer, Leipzig. - 4. Aufl. 1928
1911: Menedem. Die Geschichte eines Ungläubigen. Cotta, Stuttgart. - 2. u. 3. Tsd. 1921
1919: Von Hass und Liebe : 5 Erzählungen aus verklungenen Zeiten. Quelle & Meyer, Leipzig
1922: Helle und dunkle Klänge in Gedichten. Quelle & Meyer, Leipzig
1923: Neue Novellen und Legenden aus verklungenen Zeiten. Quelle & Meyer, Leipzig
1923: Moderne Novellen. Quelle & Meyer, Leipzig
1927: Roxane: Ein Alexanderroman in 10 Handlungen. Quelle & Meyer, Leipzig
1930: Rätsel und Silbenspiele. Elwert, Marburg
1931: König wider Willen. - Achill. 2 Novellen. Quelle & Meyer, Leipzig

References

External links 
The Nature of the Ancient Book at the Internet Archive (German)
The Book Scroll in Ancient Art at the Internet Archive (German)
Kritik and Hermeneutik at the Internet Archive (German)
Wikisource has many of Birt's publications (German)

See also

Franz Gundlach: Catalogus professorum academiae Marburgensis, 1527–1910. Marburg 1927, p. 340.
Inge Auerbach: Catalogus professorum academiae Marburgensis. Zweiter Band: 1910 bis 1971. Marburg 1979, p. 467.
Hermann Bengtson: Birt, Theodor. In: Neue Deutsche Biographie (NDB). Band 2, Duncker & Humblot, Berlin 1955, p. 260 ff. (Digitalized).
Eckart Mensching: Nugae zur Philologie-Geschichte, 9 (1996), pp. 9–66.

1852 births
1933 deaths